The 1968 United States presidential election in Washington took place on November 5, 1968, as part of the 1968 United States presidential election. State voters chose nine representatives, or electors, to the Electoral College, who voted for president and vice president.

Washington was won by the Democratic candidate, Vice President Hubert Humphrey, with 47.23 percent of the popular vote, against the Republican candidate, former Senator and Vice President Richard Nixon, with 45.12 percent of the popular vote. American candidate George Wallace also appeared on the ballot, finishing with 7.44 percent of the popular vote.

Despite Nixon losing the statewide election, he became the first Republican to carry Ferry County since Warren G. Harding did so in 1920. Along with Maine, Washington was one of only two states that Nixon lost in 1968 that he won in his unsuccessful attempt at the presidency in 1960.

This election would prove the last time the Democrats won any mainland postbellum state until Michael Dukakis carried Washington and Oregon in 1988 – in the intervening period many pundits spoke of a "Solid Republican West". This was the fifth and final election in which Washington voted for a different candidate than neighboring Oregon.

Results

Results by county

See also
 United States presidential elections in Washington (state)

Notes

References

Washington
1968
1968 Washington (state) elections